Re:Stupid (stylized Re:STUPiD) is the fifth album by Japanese idol group BiS released through the independent label Tsubasa Records on February 22, 2017. The album is the second album released by the group after their reformation in 2016, and is the first album to feature the same lineup as the previous album. All of the album's tracks were released on Soundcloud and OTOTOY prior to the album's release, with the exception of "gives" which was released as a music video on YouTube.

Track listing

Personnel
BiS
Pour Lui – vocals; Lyrics on Tracks 6 and 8
Aya Eightprince – vocals
Peri Ubu – vocals, lyrics on Track 7
Kika Front Frontalle – vocals, lyrics on Track 9
Go Zeela – vocals, lyrics on Tracks 2, 4 and 5

Notes
All writing, arrangement and personnel credits taken from the album insert.

References

2017 albums
Bis (Japanese idol group) albums